Jayson Warner Smith is an American actor who began his career in 2010 and is known for portraying Gavin in the television series The Walking Dead. He is also known for his role in Rectify as Wendall Jelks and as Dean in The Vampire Diaries.

Early life and career 
Smith was born in Atlanta. He started in theatre at age nine. He also teaches acting at The Robert Mello Studio in Atlanta. In 2010, he finally scored a larger supporting role in a Hollywood film. He has performed in supporting roles in films and TV shows such as the 2011 remake of Footloose, Anchorman II, The Vampire Diaries, 99 Homes, Mississippi Grind, 42, and Fox's Sleepy Hollow.

In addition to those credits, Smith is best known for his portrayal of death-row inmate Wendall Jelks on Sundance TV's Rectify. Beginning in 2015, Smith performed in supporting roles in the films Devil and the Deep Blue Sea, Christine, The Birth of a Nation, and Mena. Atlanta remains his home and he lives in Sandy Springs with his wife Lisa. He is repped by Alexander White in Atlanta and The House of Representatives in Los Angeles, became known for portraying Gavin an antagonistic character from the horror television series The Walking Dead.

Filmography

Film

Television

References

External links

Living people
American male television actors
American male film actors
Actors from Atlanta
Year of birth missing (living people)